Yusu station(유수역,柳樹驛) was a railway station on the Gyeongjeon Line in South Korea. The station building was demolished in 1986.

History
The station was opened in February of 1967 and it existed between Naedong and Wansa stations.Trains ceased to operate on the station in 2007.The station officially became defunct in 2016.

References

Railway stations in South Gyeongsang Province